Littlehampton East is an electoral division of West Sussex in the United Kingdom and returns one member to sit on West Sussex County Council.

Extent
The division covers the eastern part of the town of Littlehampton.

It comprises the following Arun District wards: Beach Ward, the eastern part of Brookfield Ward, and the northern part of Rustington West Ward; and of the following civil parishes: the eastern part of Littlehampton and the northwestern part of Rustington.

Election results

2013 Election
Results of the election held on 2 May 2013:

2009 Election
Results of the election held on 4 June 2009:

2005 Election
Results of the election held on 5 May 2005:

References
Election Results - West Sussex County Council

External links
 West Sussex County Council
 Election Maps

Electoral Divisions of West Sussex
Littlehampton